

Wolf Leslau (born November 14, 1906 in Krzepice, Vistula Land, Poland; died November 18, 2006 in Fullerton, California) was a scholar of Semitic languages and one of the foremost authorities on Semitic languages of Ethiopia.

Youth and education
Leslau was born in Krzepice, a small town near Częstochowa, Poland. When he was a child his family was very poor, and after contracting tuberculosis he usually had to keep a thermometer with him to monitor his body temperature, although the reasons for this are unknown. He was orphaned by the age of 10, and was raised by his brother, and received a yeshiva education.

To avoid military service in the Polish army, he gave up his Polish citizenship (becoming a stateless person) and emigrated to Vienna, where he would engage in Semitic studies at the University of Vienna until 1931. He then went to the Sorbonne to study under Marcel Cohen. His studies included most of the Semitic languages, including Hebrew, Aramaic, Akkadian, Soqotri and Ethiopic.

War years
Leslau was arrested by the French police and sent to an internment camp in the Pyrenees where he spent the harsh winter of 1939-1940 with his wife and child. He was later moved to Camp des Milles, a concentration camp near Aix-en-Provence. However, with the assistance of an international aid group, he escaped with his family before the Nazis took over the camp in 1942.

Escaping to the United States, he later became a naturalized U.S. citizen. He settled in New York City, and received a Guggenheim Fellowship to continue his studies of the Semitic languages in Ethiopia. He traveled throughout the country, recording endangered Ethiopian languages. For one language, Gafat, Leslau was able to locate only four speakers. It became extinct shortly thereafter.

Career in the United States and fieldwork
After teaching at the Asia Institute, the New School for Social Research, and for 4 years at Brandeis University, he joined the faculty of University of California, Los Angeles in 1955. He was instrumental in establishing the Department of Near Eastern Studies and the Center for Near East Studies.

Ethiopia
Leslau specialized in previously unrecorded and unstudied Semitic languages of Ethiopia. His first trip to Ethiopia in 1946 was funded by a Guggenheim fellowship.

South Arabia and Yemen
In 1950, Leslau traveled to South Arabia and Yemen. There he made field recordings at gatherings of South Arabian Bedouins and Yemenite Jews. In 1951, the recordings were issued by Folkways Records as Music of South Arabia in their "ethnic" series, FE-4221. The recordings, as well as Leslau's liner notes, are available for download from Smithsonian Folkways.

Recognitions and retirement
In 1965 Leslau received the Haile Selassie Prize for Ethiopian Studies in Addis Ababa from Ethiopian Emperor Haile Selassie. He held the position of Professor Emeritus at UCLA until his death at the age of 100. He remained active in research and writing until his death. He learned to use a Macintosh computer at the age of 80.

Leslau died at a nursing home in Fullerton, California, in 2006.

Partial bibliography
 1938: Lexique Soqotri (sudarabique moderne) avec comparaisons et explications étymologiques. Paris: Klincksieck.
 1941: Documents tigrigna: grammaire et textes. Paris: Libraire C. Klincksieck.
 1945: Short Grammar of Tigré. Publications of the American Oriental Society, Offprint Series, No. 18. New Haven.
 1945: Gafat Documents: Records of a South-Ethiopic language. American Oriental series, no. 28. New Haven.
 1950: Ethiopic Documents: Gurage. New York: Viking Fund Publications in Anthropology, no. 14.
 1951: Falasha Anthology. Yale Judaica Series, vol. 6. New Haven & London: Yale University Press.
 1956: Étude descriptive et comparative du Gafat (éthiopien méridional). Paris: Klincksieck, xx + 277 p.
 1958: Ethiopic and South Arabic contributions to the Hebrew lexicon. Berkeley: Univ. of California Press, 76 p.
 1958: The verb in Harari. Berkeley: Univ. of California Press, x + 86 p.
 1965: An Amharic Conversation Book. Wiesbaden: Harrassowitz.
 1965: Ethiopians speak. Studies in cultural background. Part 1: Harari. Near Eastern Studies, no. 7. Berkeley: University of California Press.
 1965: An annotated bibliography of the Semitic languages of Ethiopia. The Hague: Mouton.
 1966: Ethiopians Speak: Studies in Cultural Background. Part 2: Chaha. University of California Publication. Near Eastern Studies, no. 9, 219 p.
 1967: Amharic Textbook. Wiesbaden: Harrassowitz.
 1968: Ethiopians Speak: Studies in Cultural Background. Part 3: Soddo. University of California Publications. Near Eastern Studies, vol. 11.
 1969: Hebrew Cognates in Amharic. Wiesbaden: Harrassowitz.
 1973: English-Amharic Context Dictionary. Wiesbaden: Harrassowitz, xviii + 1503 p.
 1976: Concise Amharic Dictionary. (Reissue edition: 1996) Berkeley and Los Angeles: University of California Press.
 1979: Etymological Dictionary of Gurage (Ethiopic). 3 vols. Wiesbaden: Otto Harrassowitz.
 1981: Ethiopians Speak: Studies in Cultural Background. Part 4: Muher. Äthiopistische Forschungen, no. 11. Wiesbaden: Franz Steiner Verlag.
 1982: Gurage Folklore: Proverbs, beliefs, and riddles. Studien zur Kulturkunde, no. 63. Wiesbaden: Franz Steiner Verlag.
 1983: Ethiopians Speak: Studies in Cultural Background. Part 5: Chaha and Ennemor. Äthiopistische Forschungen, no. 16. Wiesbaden: Franz Steiner Verlag.
 1987: Comparative dictionary of Ge‛ez (Classical Ethiopic) : Gǝ‛ǝz-English/English-Gǝ‛ǝz with an index of the Semitic roots. Wiesbaden: Harrassowitz, xlix + 813 p.
 1988: Fifty Years of Research: Selection of articles on Semitic, Ethiopian Semitic and Cushitic. Wiesbaden: Harrassowitz, xlv + 503 p.
 1989: Concise dictionary of Gǝ‛ǝz (Classical Ethiopic). Wiesbaden: Harrassowitz, 247 p.
 1990: Arabic Loanwords in Ethiopian Semitic. Wiesbaden: Harrassowitz.
 1992: Gurage Studies : Collected Articles. Wiesbaden: Harrassowitz, xxix + 744 p.
 1995: Reference Grammar of Amharic. Harrassowitz, Wiesbaden.
 1997: Ethiopic Documents: Argobba. Grammar and dictionary. Wiesbaden: Harrassowitz.
 1999: Zway Ethiopic Documents. Äthiopistische Forschungen, no. 51. Wiesbaden: Harrassowitz.
 2000: Introductory Grammar of Amharic. Wiesbaden: Harrassowitz, xix + 232 p.
 2001: (with Thomas L. Kane) Amharic Cultural Reader. Wiesbaden: Harrassowitz.
 2004: The Verb in Mäsqan as Compared with other Gurage Dialects. Wiesbaden: Harrassowitz.

Festschriften
 Segert, Stanislav & András J. E. Bodrogligeti (eds.), Ethiopian Studies: Dedicated to Wolf Leslau on the Occasion of his seventy-fifth birthday, November 14, 1981 by friends and colleagues. Wiesbaden: Harrassowitz 1983, xii + 582 p..
 Kaye, Alan S. (ed.), Semitic studies in honor of Wolf Leslau on the occasion of his 85th birthday, November 14, 1991. 2 Vols. Wiesbaden: Harrasowitz 1991, lxviii. + 1719 p..
 Hudson, Grover (ed.), Essays on Gurage Language and Culture: Dedicated to Wolf Leslau on the Occasion of His 90th Birthday, November 14, 1996. Wiesbaden: Harrassowitz 1996, 239 p..

References

External links
 
 
 

Relevant literature
 Devens, Monica S., "On the Occasion of Wolf Leslau's 100th Birthday", in: Aethiopica 9 (2006), pp. 220–221.
 Müller, Walter W., "Zum Gedenken an Wolf Leslau", in: Aethiopica 10 (2007), pp. 210–218.
 Fikre Tolossa. Wolf Leslau (1906-2006). 2007. International Journal of Ethiopian Studies 3.1: 121-123.
 Kaye, Alan S. "Wolf Leslau." Language'' 83, no. 4 (2007): 870-875.

1906 births
2006 deaths
People from Kłobuck County
Jewish social scientists
Linguists from Poland
Linguists from Austria
Linguists from the United States
Men centenarians
Polish centenarians
Semiticists
Ethiopianists
Polish Africanists
American Africanists
University of Paris alumni
Polish Orthodox Jews
Polish emigrants to the United States
American people of Austrian-Jewish descent
American people of Polish-Jewish descent
20th-century linguists